The Brian Jonestown Massacre is an American eclectic musical group led by Anton Newcombe, whose music spans multiple genres including psychedelia, electronica, folk music, blues, and experimental music.

The group was founded by Newcombe, Matt Hollywood, Ricky Rene Maymi, Patrick Straczek and Travis Threlkel in the early 1990s in San Francisco.

The BJM has undergone many personnel changes with members often coming and going. Anton Newcombe is the only consistent member.

Current members and notable figures
The following members were present on the band's most recent worldwide tour in 2022:
 Anton Newcombe - vocals, guitars (1990–present)
 Ricky Maymi – guitar (formerly drums & bass). (1990–1993, 2003–present)
 Hákon Aðalsteinsson - guitars (2018-present)
 Collin Hegna – bass (2004–2018, 2022)
 Ryan Van Kriedt - keyboards, guitars (2015–present)
 Uri Rennert - drums (2022)
 Joel Gion – tambourine (1994–1999, 2001, 2004–2022)
Ricky Maymi and Joel Gion have been consistent members of the band for almost three decades, however it is unknown whether the rest of the members included in this line-up for the tour will continue to work and perform with the band or if it was sole line up for this tour alone. Joel Gion is currently on tour with the band.

Former members
 Stuart Mann - drums. Also of The Wild Swans and Felix Hagan & The Family. (2018)
 Dan Allaire – drums. (2002–2018)
 Sara Neidorf - drums (2018)
 Dave Koenig - bass. (2001-2004)
 Brad Artley – drums. Also played drums for The Richmond Sluts. (1996–1997)
 Rob Campanella – keyboard, organ (and occasionally guitar). (2000–2018). Also of the psychedelic band, The Quarter After.
 Jeff Davies – Lead guitar, organ, vocalist.  Currently with Las Cruxes- (post-punk/rock'n roll) frontman in psychedelic/folk/pop band PA (guitarist/vocals/lyrics country-pop/folk rock band The Burlington Family. Previously with The Tulips and Smallstone. (1992–1999; 2001–2003)
 Frankie "Teardrop" Emerson – six and twelve string guitar. Also of the Spaghetti Western band, Spindrift. (2000–2015)
 Brian Glaze – drums. Currently a solo recording artist and member of The Gris Gris. (1994–1998)
 Peter Hayes – guitar. A founding member of alternative rock trio Black Rebel Motorcycle Club. (1997–1998)
 Dawn Thomas – bass/guitar/accordion/flute. (1993–1997)
 Collin Hegna – bass/guitar. Also of the band Federale (2004–2018, 2022 filling in for Hallbergsson)
 Matt Hollywood – guitar, vocals. Founder member. (1990–1998; 2009–2015)
 Miranda Lee Richards – guitar and vocals. Currently a solo recording artist. (1995–1999)
 Patrick Straczek – guitar. Founding member. Did not record any material with the band. Replaced by Jeff Davies in 1992. (1991)
 Dean Taylor – guitar. Currently contributes to Tokyo Raid (formerly The Mandarins). (1996–1999)
 Travis Threlkel – guitar. Founding member. Currently the creative director of multi-media design company, Obscura Digital, as well as the leader of psychedelic/experimental band The Imajinary Friends. (1990–1993)
 Matthew J. Tow – guitar. Leader of Australian band The Lovetones. Previously with indie rock bands Drop City and Colorsound. (2003)
 |
 Deborah 'Moogy' Morgan - keyboards, percussion, vocals (Only appeared at limited European shows)

Comprehensive line-up history

References

External links
BJM Archives: Past and Present Members

Lists of members by band